The 72nd edition of the Kuurne–Brussels–Kuurne cycling classic was held on 1 March 2020. It is part of the 2020 UCI Europe Tour and ranked as a UCI ProSeries event. It is the second and concluding race of the Belgian opening weekend, the year's first road races in Northwestern Europe, one day after Omloop Het Nieuwsblad.

Teams
Twenty-five teams were invited to start the race. These included eighteen UCI WorldTeams and seven UCI Professional Continental teams.

UCI WorldTeams

 
 
 
 
 
 
 
 
 
 
 
 
 
 
 
 
 

UCI Professional Continental teams

Results

References

External links

2020
2020 UCI Europe Tour
2020 in Belgian sport
March 2020 sports events in Belgium